The list of Phi Beta Sigma() Conclaves includes actual, proposed, and forthcoming international conventions of Phi Beta Sigma Fraternity.

The Conclave is the legislative power of Phi Beta Sigma. During a conclave year, delegates representing all of the active chapters from within the seven regions of the fraternity meet in the chosen city. The conclave-or fraternity convention- is currently held biannually and usually hosted by the Graduate chapter(s) of the chosen city. The host city is chosen through a selection process in which each of the eligible region nominates a city and a formal bid is submitted. As of 2009, Phi Beta Sigma has held over 95 conventions in various cities throughout the United States The fraternity held its first conclave in Washington, D.C. on December 20, 1916.

Conclave

The Conclave is the legislative power of Phi Beta Sigma. During a conclave year, delegates representing all of the active chapters from within the seven regions of the fraternity meet in the chosen city. The conclave-or fraternity convention- is currently held biannually and usually hosted by the Graduate chapter(s) of the chosen city. During the convention, members of the General Board – the administrative body of the fraternity-are elected and appointed. The general board may act in the interest of the fraternity when the conclave is not in session. In addition, seminars, social events, concerts, an international Miss Phi Beta Sigma Pageant, Stepshow, and oratorical contests are also held during the week-long conference. Throughout the years, notable individuals such as George Washington Carver, and Dr. Carter G. Woodson were speakers at past conclaves.

Host city selection process

The conclave—or fraternity convention—is currently held biannually and usually hosted by the graduate chapter(s) of the chosen city. The host city is chosen through a selection process in which each eligible region nominates a city and a formal bid is submitted. The region in which the current conclave is being held is ineligible for submitting a bid for the succeeding conclave.

List of conclaves

Notes
a.  Preferably does not include scheduled Pre-Conclave and Post-Conclave activities

b.  No conclaves were held in 1917 & 1918 due to World War I.

c.  No conclaves were held in 1931 & 1932 due to the Great Depression.

d.  No conclaves were held in 1942 & 1943 due to World War II.

References

National Conference Lists
Lists of fraternity and sorority national conferences